Cotopaxi National Park is a protected area in Ecuador situated in the Cotopaxi Province, Napo Province and Pichincha Province, roughly  south of Quito. The  Cotopaxi volcano (meaning 'smooth neck of the moon' in Quechua; Quechua q'oto 'throat' + Aymara phakhsi 'moon') that lends its name to the park is located within its boundaries, together with two others: the dormant Rumiñawi volcano to its north-west and the historical Sincholagua volcano (last major eruption: 1877) to the south east. Cotopaxi is among the highest active volcanoes in the world. Its most recent eruption began on 14 August 2015, and ended on 24 January 2016.

References

External links

 Cotopaxi Horse Tours Escape the city and experience the real Ecuadorian mountains on a horse ride 
 Cotopaxi's profile by the Ministerio del Ambiente 

Páramos
National parks of Ecuador
Geography of Cotopaxi Province
Geography of Napo Province
Geography of Pichincha Province
Tourist attractions in Cotopaxi Province
Tourist attractions in Napo Province
Tourist attractions in Pichincha Province
Protected areas established in 1975
Northwestern Andean montane forests